Kazipara Halt railway station is a halt railway station on the Howrah–Azimganj line of Howrah railway division of Eastern Railway zone. It is situated at Maklishpur, Kazipara in Murshidabad district in the Indian state of West Bengal.

History
In 1913, the Hooghly–Katwa Railway constructed a  broad gauge line from Bandel to Katwa, and the Barharwa–Azimganj–Katwa Railway constructed the  broad gauge Barharwa–Azimganj–Katwa loop. With the construction of the Farakka Barrage and opening of the railway bridge in 1971, the railway communication picture of this line were completely changed. Total 10 passengers and EMU stop at Kazipara Halt railway station.

References

Railway stations in Murshidabad district
Howrah railway division